The Philippine Public Safety College is a public educational institution in the Philippines.

The Philippine Public Safety College System is the umbrella organization that comprises the National Police College (NPC), Philippine National Police Academy (PNPA), National Police Training Institute (NPTI) with its 18 Regional Training Centers (RTCs), National Fire Training Institute (NFTI), National Jail Management and Penology Training Institute (NJMPTI), and the National Forensic Science Training Institute (NFSTI).

References

External links
 Philippine Public Safety College Website

State universities and colleges in Metro Manila
Universities and colleges in Quezon City
Department of the Interior and Local Government (Philippines)
Educational institutions established in 1993
1993 establishments in the Philippines